Felix Goyzueta (born 3 January 1991) is a Peruvian footballer who plays as a center back for Sport Áncash in the Peruvian Segunda Division.

Career
Born in Pisco, Goyzueta began playing football with Alianza Lima. He was promoted to the first team in 2008 by coach Richard Páez, along with his team-mates Aldo Corzo and Carlos Olascuaga where he never played an official match. By 2011, he was transferred to Cobresol FBC where he made his only two Peruvian Primera División appearances in the last two rounds of the 2011 tournament.

References

External links

1991 births
Living people
Footballers from Lima
Club Alianza Lima footballers
Cobresol FBC footballers
Peruvian footballers
Association football central defenders